Jin Seong-uk (Hanja: 陳成昱; born 16 December 1993) is a South Korean football forward who plays for Sangju Sangmu in K League 1.

Club career 
Jin joined Incheon United in 2012. On 18 March 2012, he made his league debut against Daegu FC by replacing Kim Han-seob.

International career 
He has been a member of the South Korea national U-23 team. He played for the South Korea in 2016 AFC U-23 Championship, played 2 games and scored 1 goal there. His first goal was scored against Japan U-23 team in Final on 30 January 2016.

Honours

International
 EAFF East Asian Cup (1): 2017

Club career statistics

References

External links

1993 births
Living people
Association football forwards
South Korean footballers
South Korea under-20 international footballers
South Korea under-23 international footballers
South Korea international footballers
Incheon United FC players
Jeju United FC players
K League 1 players
People from Changwon
Sportspeople from South Gyeongsang Province